De Waterkant is a sub-district of the suburb of Green Point, Cape Town. The neighbourhood is adjacent to the central business district on the southeastern end of Somerset Road. On the south, it is neighboured by the historically coloured district of Bo-Kaap.

De Waterkant is a convenient address for many young professionals, the upper-class, and niche restaurants and retailers. The area is home to the Cape Quarter shopping mall and Vega's Cape Town campus.

References

Further reading

Suburbs of Cape Town
Gay villages in South Africa